The Budapest Cog-wheel Railway, is a rack railway in the Buda part of the Hungarian capital city of Budapest.

The railway is operated by BKV, who also operate the city's tram and metro lines. It runs throughout the year between the hours of 0500 and 2300. As a fully integrated part of Budapest's public transport system, standard tickets and passes can be used.

The Városmajor terminus is adjacent to the Budapest tram stop of the same name, whilst the Széchenyihegy terminus is a  walk from the similarly named terminus of the Budapest Children's Railway.

History 

Since 1868 a horse tramway ran on schedule from the Lánchíd to  set in operation by the Budai Közúti Vaspálya Társaság (~ Public Railway Society of Buda).

The building permit was issued on 3 July 1873, and construction of the line began immediately, thus enabling the service to start up in the following year. The first introductory vehicle ran from 4 p.m. on 24 June 1874, and regular traffic began on the following day. The whole line was of standard gauge, built according to Riggenbach's cog-wheel system, and was operated by steam locomotives pushing coaches uphill and hauling them downhill.

Successful operation of the cog-wheel railway raised the issue of extending the line.

The municipal transportation company  took over the railway in 1926. The new owners soon started to upgrade the line, by electrifying it using the same 550/600V DC system used by the city's trams, by adding new passing loops, replacing old trackage, and providing better schedules. New  were built by SLM and Ganz, and the modernised operation started in 1929. From July 2, 1929, the new electrically powered vehicles ran every 15 minutes.

During and after World War II the line became very run down, and closure became a possibility. However this was averted, and in 1973 the line was completely rebuilt to celebrate the 100th anniversary of the merger of Buda, Pest and Óbuda into Budapest. The track was renewed using the Strub cog-wheel system, the line voltage was increased to 1,500V and new vehicles, built by SGP and BBC, introduced. The older trains last ran on 15 March 1973 and traffic using the new, and current, vehicles began on 20 August of the same year.

Future developments 
The Urban and Suburban Transit Association (VEKE) is advocating that the line be extended in both directions (Normafa and Széll Kálmán tér).

Gallery

References

External links

 
Outline of the public transport of Budapest

Transport in Budapest
Rack railways in Hungary